When Evil Speaks is the eighth album by Suicide Commando. It was released on May 6, 2013.

Track listing

CD 1 "When Evil Speaks"

CD 2 "When Hate Prevails"

CD 3 "Rewind - Live Vintage Set" 

Recorded at Tivoli De Helling, Utrecht (Holland) in July 2012.

References 
When Evil Speaks at Discogs

2013 albums
Suicide Commando albums